Bernhard Themessl (born 15 October 1951) is an Austrian politician who has been a Member of the National Council for the Freedom Party of Austria (FPÖ) since 2006.

References

1951 births
Living people
Members of the National Council (Austria)
Freedom Party of Austria politicians